Saxlingham Nethergate is a village and civil parish in Norfolk, England, about  south of Norwich.

For the purposes of local government, the parish falls within the district of South Norfolk. The Church of England parish church of St. Mary is Decorated Gothic, with a chancel, nave and square west tower with a ring of eight bells. In 1867 the church was thoroughly restored, the nave enlarged, a vestry added and a stained glass window inserted in the tower: several of the other windows are stained glass. Saxlingham Nethergate Church of England Primary school is a mixed school for ages 4 - 11 with a capacity of 77 pupils and was rated GOOD in its 2018 Ofsted inspection

Recreation
The Saxlingham Cricket Club is home to the Saxlingham Gents cricket team which plays in the Norfolk Alliance league in Division Six.
The recreation ground in the village hosts the cricket pitch, Saxon Bowls Club  and the 43rd Saxlingham Nethergate Scout Group.

Notable residents
Michael Andrews (artist)
Samuel William King (1821–1868), rector of Saxlingham Nethergate and geologist
Richard K. Morgan
Eddie 'Bertie' Boulter DFC (1923-2010), WWII RAF pilot, inventor of the balanced flue boiler, author.
Eric Pleasants, one of the few British members of the SS and a Gulag internee.

See also
, a

References

External links

Civil parishes in Norfolk
South Norfolk
Villages in Norfolk